Sonámbulo (or Sonambulo) is a word in the Spanish language meaning sleepwalker.

sonámbulo may refer to:

Sonámbulo, an independent comic-book by Rafael Navarro which combines elements of lucha libre and noir
Sonámbulo, the protagonist of the series
"Sonámbulo", a song by Fernando Villalona
"Sonámbulo", a song by Tito Nieves
Sonámbulo, also known as The Sleepwalker, a 2015 Spanish animated short film